Kanchana Ganga is a 2004 Kannada-language romantic drama film directed and written by Rajendra Singh Babu and produced by Vijayalakshmi Singh, Dushyant Singh and Jai Jagadish. The film stars Shiva Rajkumar and Sridevi Vijaykumar along with Jai Jagadish, Parvin Dabbas, Sumalatha and Arjun in other pivotal roles. The film was the last work of veteran cinematographer B. C. Gowrishankar who died before the release of the film.

The film featured original score and soundtrack composed and written by S. A. Rajkumar. The film received the Karnataka State Award for best Costume design special award for the year 2004–05.

Cast 
 Shiva Rajkumar as Soorya
 Sridevi Vijaykumar as Urmila
 Jai Jagadish 
 Arjun (Firoz Khan)
 Sumalatha
 Parvin Dabbas
 Sadhu Kokila
 Raju Ananthaswamy
 Chaitra
 Neelam

Soundtrack 
The music was composed by S. A. Rajkumar and the audio was sold on Ashwini Audio label. A popular title song from the film Naa Ninna Mareyalare was reused in the soundtrack.

References

External links 

 Movie review

2004 films
2000s Kannada-language films
Indian romantic drama films
Films directed by Rajendra Singh Babu
2004 romantic drama films